Max Rose is a 2016 American drama film written and directed by Daniel Noah, and distributed by Paladin Films. The film stars Jerry Lewis, Kevin Pollak, Kerry Bishé, Claire Bloom and Dean Stockwell. Its story follows a jazz pianist who suspects that his wife of 65 years may have been unfaithful.

The film was among the last released for Jerry Lewis, Dean Stockwell and Mort Sahl, before their passings in 2017 and 2021 respectively, although Lewis and Stockwell filmed scenes for other films later that were released before Max Rose, including The Trust, Persecuted, and Entertainment.

The film was produced by Lightstream Entertainment and Rush River Entertainment. An initial cut of the film was shown at the 2013 Cannes Film Festival. It grossed $4,000 in its opening weekend, and $66,680 worldwide, and has an approval rating of 37% based on 43 reviews Rotten Tomatoes.

Plot
Max Rose is an aging jazz pianist who learns that his wife of 65 years may have been unfaithful to him. Though his career was not everything he had hoped it would be, Max Rose always felt like a success because his beautiful, elegant wife, Eva, was by his side. While going through her things, however, Max discovers an object bearing an intimate inscription from another man, a shocking revelation that leads him to believe his entire marriage, indeed, his entire life, was built on a lie. Coping with anger, withdrawal and his own fragile health, Rose embarks on an exploration of his past, all the while searching for Eva's mystery suitor, hoping to find the answers he needs to be at peace.

Cast
 Jerry Lewis as Max Rose
 Kerry Bishé as Annie Rose
 Illeana Douglas as Jenny Flowers
 Rance Howard as Walter Prewitt
 Kevin Pollak as Christopher Rose
 Mort Sahl as Jack Murphy
 Dean Stockwell as Ben Tracey
 Lee Weaver as Lee Miller
 Fred Willard as Jim Clark
 Claire Bloom as Eva Rose

Production
It was Lewis's first starring film role since 1995's Funny Bones, as well as his final starring role. Oscar winners Michel Legrand with Alan and Marilyn Bergman created an original song for the feature. The film was produced by Lightstream Entertainment's Garrett Kelleher and Blackbird's Lawrence Inglee, along with Rush River's Bill Walton.

Release
A preliminary cut of the film was shown at the Cannes Film Festival in 2013. It had its first official screening, and US premiere, at the Museum of Modern Art as the final piece of a MOMA exhibition called "Happy Birthday, Mr. Lewis: The Kid Turns 90" in April 2016. Max Rose received a limited theatrical release through Paladin in September 2016, with nationwide expansion in October 2016.

Reception
The film has a 37% rating on Rotten Tomatoes, based on 43 critic reviews, stating that "Max Rose marks Jerry Lewis' long-overdue return to the screen – and is unfortunately less than memorable in almost every other respect."

References

External links

2016 films
2016 drama films
American drama films
Films about old age
2010s English-language films
2010s American films